István Hámori (born 30 September 1967) is a retired Hungarian football goalkeeper.

References

1967 births
Living people
Hungarian footballers
Veikkausliiga players
Vasas SC players
Vác FC players
FC Lahti players
Association football goalkeepers
Hungarian expatriate footballers
Expatriate footballers in Finland
Hungarian expatriate sportspeople in Finland